Denmark are set to compete at the 2017 World Aquatics Championships in Budapest, Hungary from 14 July to 30 July 2017.

Medalists

Withdrawals
In March 2017, Jeanette Ottesen announced that she would not seek qualification for the Championships, as she would focus on the short course season in the fall, culminating in the European Championships on home soil. Later, Ottesen would go on to announce her pregnancy and a longer hiatus from swimming.

In April, Mie Nielsen withdrew after having met the qualification criteria for the 50 and 100 metres backstroke, citing a lack of motivation and fatigue following the previous summer's Olympics.

Swimming

Danish swimmers have achieved qualifying standards in the following events (up to a maximum of 2 swimmers in each event at the A-standard entry time, and 1 at the B-standard):

Men

Women

Mixed

References

Nations at the 2017 World Aquatics Championships
Denmark at the World Aquatics Championships
2017 in Danish sport